Dr. Deborah Thigpen (born in Cleveland, Ohio) is an American entrepreneur.  Her career began  as a publicist with Denver-based Up With People, Inc. (UWP) an international theatrical touring company. As publicist with UWP, she handled media relations in 39 states, Puerto Rico, Venezuela and London. Her connection with the music industry continued as a publicist for Boston, Los Angeles based Alan Haymon Productions, Promotions Director of KQXL radio in Baton Rouge, LA., and Promotions Assistant at WBUR, National Public Radio, in Boston, MA.

She received her B.S. in journalism in 1978 from Bowling Green State University. She earned her M.A. in management (2005) and D.M. (2011) from the University of Phoenix. Dr. Thigpen also received executive training at the Amos Tuck School of Business at Dartmouth College, Boston University, and Kent State University.

She started Thigpen & Adsociates, Inc. a public relations and marketing communications firm in 1988, and changed the name to Thigpen & Associates Public Relations in 2006. In 2009, she was honored with the Nation’s Top Businesses, presented by DiversityBusiness.com. In 1997, Dr. Thigpen was named. The National Minority Small Business Person of the year by the U.S. Small Business Administration and inducted in 1996, Corporate Leaders Hall of Fame by the Ohio Assembly of Councils.
Thigpen has consulted for EPA, Goodyear, Harris County Flood Control District, NASA, Ohio Lottery, The Cleveland Cavaliers, and others. Her doctorate dissertation “Factors Influencing the Success of African American Women Small Business Owner” is in working for book publication.

Personal life 
Dr. Thigpen is a diamond life member of Delta Sigma Theta sorority. Thigpen also served as an adjunct professor at Texas Southern University and Sports Information Director at Prairie View A&M University.  In her leisure time, she enjoys camping, horseback riding, photography, and traveling to vibrant international destinations.

References 

Living people
American entertainment industry businesspeople
Bowling Green State University alumni
Year of birth missing (living people)